Jeffrey Gouweleeuw (born 10 July 1991) is a Dutch professional footballer who plays as a centre-back for and captains Bundesliga club FC Augsburg.

Club career

AZ
Born in Heemskerk, Gouweleeuw began his early career with ADO '20 and Heerenveen, before signing a five-year contract with AZ in May 2013, having received interest from the club since December 2012.

In August 2015, after being made club captain at AZ, a transfer to Greek club Olympiacos fell through. He suffered an injury in December 2015, one of a number of AZ's defenders on the sidelines.

FC Augsburg
In January 2016 he moved to German club FC Augsburg. He spoke of his joy at the move. He made his debut for the club on 14 February 2016 in a 2–1 home loss to Bayern Munich in the Bundesliga, covering Thomas Müller as a defensive midfielder. 

On 11 September 2016 he scored his first goal for Augsburg in a 2–1 victory against Werder Bremen.

Following the retirement of Daniel Baier in September 2020, Gouweleeuw was made captain of Augsburg by head coach Heiko Herrlich.

International career
He has played for the Netherlands under-21 national team.

Career statistics

References

1991 births
Living people
People from Heemskerk
Dutch footballers
ADO '20 players
SC Heerenveen players
AZ Alkmaar players
FC Augsburg players
Eredivisie players
Bundesliga players
Association football central defenders
Netherlands under-21 international footballers
Dutch expatriate footballers
Dutch expatriate sportspeople in Germany
Expatriate footballers in Germany
Footballers from North Holland